The following lists events that happened during 1936 in Cape Verde.

Incumbents
Colonial governor: Amadeu Gomes de Figueiredo

Events

March
The literary review Claridade was first published

References

 
1936 in the Portuguese Empire
Years of the 20th century in Cape Verde
1930s in Cape Verde
Cape Verde
Cape Verde